Phaenanthoecium is a genus of plants in the grass family. The only known species is Phaenanthoecium koestlinii, native to Northeast Tropical Africa (Sudan, Ethiopia and Eritrea) and Yemen.

References

Danthonioideae
Grasses of Africa
Flora of Yemen
Flora of Northeast Tropical Africa
Monotypic Poaceae genera
Taxa named by Charles Edward Hubbard